Niandi Township (Mandarin: 廿地乡) is a township in Gonghe County, Hainan Tibetan Autonomous Prefecture, Qinghai, China. In 2010, Niandi Township had a total population of 4,072: 2,099 males and 1,973 females: 930 aged under 14, 2,887 aged between 15 and 65 and 255 aged over 65.

References 

Township-level divisions of Qinghai
Hainan Tibetan Autonomous Prefecture